Stoned Soul Picnic is an album by American jazz vibraphonist Roy Ayers released on the Atlantic label in 1968.

Reception

AllMusic noted "the group keeps the groove percolating nicely throughout, making Stoned Soul Picnic one of Ayers' better jazz-oriented outings".

Track listing
 "A Rose for Cindy" (Roy Ayers) - 8:56
 "Stoned Soul Picnic" (Laura Nyro) - 2:50
 "Wave" (Antônio Carlos Jobim) - 7:59
 "For Once in My Life" (Ron Miller, Orlando Murden) - 3:50
 "Lil's Paradise" (Charles Tolliver) - 6:33 
 "What the People Say" (Edwin Birdsong) - 8:09

Personnel 
Roy Ayers - vibraphone
Charles Tolliver - trumpet, flugelhorn 
Hubert Laws - flute, piccolo
Gary Bartz - alto saxophone 
Herbie Hancock - piano
Ron Carter (tracks 1 & 2), Miroslav Vitouš (tracks 3-6) - bass
Grady Tate - drums
Herbie Mann - producer

References 

1968 albums
Roy Ayers albums
Atlantic Records albums